Derk Adriaan Rijkens (born 16 December 1975) is a former Dutch international cricketer who represented the Dutch national side in several matches in 1998. He played as a right-handed middle-order batsman.

Rijkens was born in The Hague, and played his club cricket for HCC. He made his senior debut for the Netherlands on a tour of England in June 1998, which included a friendly against Devon (a minor county) and a NatWest Trophy match against Somerset. In the game against Somerset, which held List A status, he came in seventh in the batting order, scoring 12 runs before being dismissed by Graham Rose. Later in the year, Rijkens also represented the Netherlands in a one-day match against South Africa (on its way to a tour of England), as well in a single match at the European Championship.

References

External links
Player profile and statistics at Cricket Archive
Player profile and statistics at ESPNcricinfo

1975 births
Living people
Dutch cricketers
Sportspeople from The Hague